Calvin Cabell Tennis (born October 24, 1932) is an American prelate who was the Bishop of Delaware from 1986 to 1997.

Biography 
Tennis was born on October 24, 1932, in Hampton, Virginia. He studied at the College of William & Mary from where he graduated with a Bachelor of Arts in 1954 and with a Juris Doctor, in 1956 after which he was admitted to the Virginia State Bar. Later, Tennis studied at the Virginia Theological Seminary from where he graduated with a Master of Divinity in 1964.

He was ordained to deacon in 1964 and the priest on December 19, 1964. In 1964 he became curate at St John's Church in Portsmouth, Virginia, after which he became rector of Trinity Church in Buffalo, New York. In 1972 he became dean and rector of St Mark's Cathedral in Seattle. He also served as a deputy to the 1982 General Convention and was for a time adjunct professor at the General Theological Seminary.

On June 14, 1986, he was elected Bishop of Delaware and was consecrated on November 8, 1986, by Arthur Heath Light of Southwestern Virginia in St Helena's Roman Catholic Church in Wilmington, Delaware. Before his retirement, Tennis was one of the bishops involved in the heresy trial instigated against Bishop Walter C. Righter after ordaining a gay person as a deacon. Tennis retired on December 31, 1997.

References

1932 births
Living people
American Episcopalians
People from Hampton, Virginia
Place of birth missing (living people)
College of William & Mary alumni
Virginia Theological Seminary alumni
Episcopal bishops of Delaware